Ola Värmlänning was a drunken prankster whose legendary exploits were once very popular among the Swedish-American communities of Minnesota. A Swedish language book about him is in the collections of the Minnesota Historical Society.

Folk hero

See also
Minnesota folklore

Sources
 

Folklore characters
Minnesota folklore
Tall tales
American folklore